Dichlorodiethyl sulfone (or mustard sulfone) is an oxidation product of mustard gas. It has the formula (ClCH2CH2)2SO2. Although it is irritating to the eyes, it is not nearly as bad as mustard gas (dichlorodiethyl sulfide).

Structure
The all-trans arrangement is predicted by Hartree-Fock computational methods to be the most stable conformer.

Reactions
When refluxed with aqueous sodium hydroxide, oxygen replaces the chlorine, and an 1,4-oxathiane ring is formed, p-oxathiane-4,4-dioxide. When treated with sodium carbonate, a weaker base, bis-(hydroxyethyl)sulfone is the major product formed. In comparison the dehydrochlorination of the sulfoxide is much slower.

References

Sulfones
Organochlorides